Richlands may refer to:

Australia 

 Richlands, Queensland, a suburb in Brisbane

United States 
 Richlands, North Carolina
 Richlands, Virginia
 Richlands, West Virginia
 Richlands High School (North Carolina)
 Richlands High School (Richlands, Virginia)